The 2018 PSSI Anniversary Cup was a four-team under-23 association football tournament held at Pakansari Stadium in Cibinong, Bogor Regency from 27 April until 3 May 2018. The tournament was organised to commemorate the 88th anniversary of Football Association of Indonesia (PSSI). Earlier, the tournament was expected to be kicked off on 28 April, however PSSI later changed it on 27 April due to Liga 1 matches that were to be held on that day.

Bahrain emerged as the tournament champion with 7 points ahead of the rest of the teams.

Participating nations 
A total of four nations comprising host Indonesia, Bahrain, North Korea and Malaysia have earlier announced their participation in the tournament. On 12 April 2018, Malaysia announced their withdrawal as the tournament date is coinciding with their league schedule that resulted in each of their players to be busy with their respective club matches that will prevent them from playing with the national team. Two replacement candidates from Senegal and Uzbekistan are then called by PSSI, with Thailand, Vietnam, Turkmenistan and Tajikistan being also decided as other potential candidates despite both Thailand and Vietnam having responded that their players were also busy with tight league schedules in their country. The PSSI later decided Uzbekistan as the suitable replacement candidate.
  (Host)
 
 
  (replacing )

Match officials 
The following referees and their assistants were chosen for the tournament.

Referees

  Khuon Virak
  Luk Kin Sun
  Musthofa Umarella
  Yudi Nurcahya

Assistant referees

  Fok Pong Shing
  Wong Ping Chung
  Agus Mulyadi
  Agus Prima Aspa
  Dedek Duha

Regulation 
The tournament followed Asian Games regulation with all participating teams will be using their U-23 national team with an advantage to use three senior players. It was decided through a round-robin format and team with the highest point would become the winner.

Venue 
The sole venue stadium was the Pakansari Stadium in Cibinong of Bogor Regency. Earlier, the PSSI also expected the Gelora Bung Karno Stadium in Jakarta to be used for the tournament, but the stadium was being renovated to host the upcoming 2018 Asian Games, where Indonesia became the host.

Standings

Matches 
 All matches played in Indonesia
 Times listed are local (UTC+7:00)

Winners

Goalscorers 
3 goals

  Mohamed Marhoon

2 goals

  Ahmed Al-Sherooqi
  Jo Sol-song

1 goal

  Ahmed Sanad
  Jasim Alsalma
  Sayed Hashim Isa
  Song Kum-song
  Khojiakbar Alijonov
  Azibek Amonov
  Husniddin Gafurov
  Sanjar Kodirkulov
  Andrey Sidorov

References 

International association football competitions hosted by Indonesia
April 2018 sports events in Indonesia
May 2018 sports events in Indonesia